Gamma Andromeda may refer to:
Gamma Andromeda (planet), a star system in the novel Foundation by Isaac Asimov
Gamma Andromedae, a four star system in the constellation Andromeda